The Camayo Arcade is a historic shopping arcade located along Winchester Avenue in downtown Ashland, Kentucky. It opened in July 1926 and was the first indoor shopping mall built in the state of Kentucky. The building is part of the Ashland Commercial Historic District.

History

On September 22, 1925, a construction contract was awarded to C. Harrison Smith, a general contractor from Huntington, West Virginia. Demolition of the Josselson Brothers Furniture Store began the following week on the site where the arcade would be constructed. By this time, 60% of the retail space on the second and third floors of the building had been leased. The storefronts were constructed out of rosetta marble and each interior store featured a depth of 17.5 feet, with a width of 15, 30 or 45 feet, with or without partitions.  Electrical fixtures were installed beginning in June 1925 by the Beardslee Chandelier Manufacturing Company of Chicago. The arcade opened under the management of John C. C. Mayo, Jr. and Alexander Cameron in July 1926.

On October 9, 1926, the  Camayo Arcade Recreation Center opened in basement of the building. The recreation center featured billiards tables and a bowling alley. Once completed, the Camayo Arcade had  of total floor space.

The building underwent significant renovations in 2012 after being purchased by resident Perry Madden.

See also

Arcade (architecture)
Ashland Commercial Historic District
Cityscape of Ashland, Kentucky
Retail
Shopping Arcade

References

Commercial buildings completed in 1926
Shopping malls established in 1926
Shopping malls in Kentucky
Shopping arcades in the United States
Ashland, Kentucky
National Register of Historic Places in Boyd County, Kentucky
Historic district contributing properties in Kentucky
1926 establishments in Kentucky